Well Oiled may refer to:

Well Oiled (The Quireboys album)
Well Oiled (Hash Jar Tempo album), 1997
Well Oiled, an album by the UK band Engine
Well Oiled (film), a 1947 Woody Woodpecker cartoon